The Fool and the Princess is a 1948 British drama film directed by William C. Hammond and starring Bruce Lester, Lesley Brook and Adina Mandlová. It was made at the Merton Park Studios.

Main cast
 Bruce Lester - Harry Granville 
 Lesley Brook - Kate Granville 
 Adina Mandlová - Moura 
 Murray Matheson - Graham Ballard 
 Irene Handl - Mrs Wicker 
 Vi Kaley - Mrs Jenkins
 MacDonald Parke - Colonel Wingfield

References

External links

1948 films
British black-and-white films
British drama films
1948 drama films
1940s English-language films
1940s British films